The Thomas A. Edison Memorial Bridge, otherwise known as the Edison Bridge, carries Ohio State Routes 2 and 269 over Sandusky Bay. It was named for inventor and nearby Milan native Thomas Edison.

Predecessor

The Edison Bridge replaced the Bay Bridge, a lift bridge which was dedicated on February 2, 1929. The Bay Bridge was initially a private bridge maintained by the Sandusky Bay Bridge Company, which charged a 50-cent toll; the Ohio Department of Highways bought it for $1,795,000, at first lowering the toll to 25 cents then abolishing it on August 30, 1946. The Ohio Department of Transportation closed the lift span on April 19, 1985 after an inspection which predicted a collapse due to its own weight; it formally abandoned the span in April 1986 and subsequently removed it in May 1989, converting its approaches to fishing piers.

References

External links

"Port Clinton and the Sandusky Bay Bridges". Roadfan.com.

Buildings and structures in Erie County, Ohio
Buildings and structures in Ottawa County, Ohio
Transportation in Erie County, Ohio
Transportation in Ottawa County, Ohio
Road bridges in Ohio
Former toll bridges in Ohio
Bridges completed in 1965